is a Japanese manga artist. She debuted as an adult manga artist in 2009.  Her most famous work is the series Scum's Wish, which was adapted in a one-season TV anime series by the studio Lerche.

Works
  (2010–2012)
  (2011)
  (2012–2017, story by Lynn Okamoto)
  (2012–2017)
  (2013-2017)
  (2014–2018) 
  (2018-2020, short stories compilation)
  (2020–present, story by Aka Akasaka)

Specials and one shots
 I Am a Hero short story (2016) (included on )
  (2013) (included as the sixth and final story on volume 2 of )

References

External links 
  

Living people
1988 births
Japanese female comics artists
Manga artists from Mie Prefecture